Michael Williams or Micheal Williams may refer to:

Authors
 Michael Williams (author) (born 1952), known for his Dragonlance novels
 Michael Allen Williams, author of Rethinking "Gnosticism": An Argument for Dismantling a Dubious Category

Fictional characters
 Michael Williams (Henry V), a character in William Shakespeare's Henry V
 Michael Williams (Neighbours), a character from the soap opera Neighbours

Music
 Michael Williams (guitarist), American blues guitarist
 Michael James Williams (c. 1944–1983), known as Prince Far I, Jamaican reggae musician
 Michael Glenn Williams (born 1957), composer, pianist and technologist
 Michael F. Williams (born 1962), New Zealand composer of contemporary classical music
 Michael Williams II (born 1989), American record producer known professionally as Mike Will Made It

Politics
 Michael Williams (MP) (1785–1858), MP for West Cornwall and owner of Caerhays castle
 Sir Michael S. Williams (1911–1984), British diplomat
 Michael J. Williams (politician) (born 1929), Trinidad and Tobago politician and businessman, acting President 1986–1987
 Michael Williams, Baron Williams of Baglan (1949–2017), British diplomat and United Nations Special Coordinator for Lebanon
 Michael L. Williams (born 1953), Texas Railroad Commissioner; departing Texas education commissioner
 Micheal R. Williams (born 1955), American politician from Tennessee
 Michael Williams (Georgia politician) (born 1973), Republican member of the Georgia State Senate
 Michael John Williams (born 1979), Congressional candidate for the 5th District of Connecticut

Sports

American football
 Michael Williams (running back) (born 1961), American football player
 Michael Williams (defensive back) (born 1970), American football player
 Michael Williams (defensive lineman) (born 1984), American football defensive end
 Michael Williams (tight end) (born 1990), American football offensive lineman

Other sports
 Michael Williams (figure skater) (born 1947), British ice skater
 Michael Williams (boxer) (born 1962), American boxer and actor
 Michael Williams (athlete) (born 1964), Vincentian sprinter
 Micheal Williams (born 1966), American basketball player
 H. Michael Williams (fl. 2010s), American athletic director
 Michael Williams (footballer) (born 1988), Montserattian footballer
 MJ Williams (Michael Jordan Williams, born 1995), Welsh footballer

TV and film
 Michael Williams (actor) (1935–2001), British actor and husband of Judi Dench
 Michael Williams (film producer) (born 1957), 2004 Academy Award winner for the documentary The Fog of War
 Michael K. Williams (1966–2021), American actor best known for his role in The Wire
 Michael C. Williams (born 1973), American actor
 Michael Williams (film director) (born 1987), American film director
 Michael Williams (Canadian TV personality), former MuchMusic VJ

Other
 Michael Williams (geographer) (1935–2009), Welsh historical geographer
 Michael J. Williams (born 1943), retired United States Marine Corps four-star general
 Michael Ingouville Williams (born 1946), Lord-Lieutenant of East Lothian, Scotland
 Michael Williams (philosopher) (born 1947), professor of philosophy at Johns Hopkins University
 Michael Williams, academic in Indigenous Australian studies whose historical framework influenced Wesley Enoch's play The 7 Stages of Grieving
 Michael R. Williams, president of the University of North Texas Health Science Center
 Michael Williams, defendant in United States v. Williams (2008)
 Michael Williams (bishop), American Anglican bishop and retired U.S. Air Force chaplain
Michael C. Williams (political scientist)

See also
 Michael Carter-Williams (born 1991), American basketball player
 Jerry Michael Williams (1969–2000), American murder victim
 Mike Williams (disambiguation)